Nevoid melanoma is a cutaneous condition that may resemble a Spitz nevus or an acquired or congenital melanocytic nevus.

See also 
 Melanoma
 List of cutaneous conditions

References 

Melanoma